Nicolò Rovella (born 4 December 2001) is an Italian professional footballer who plays as a midfielder for  club Monza, on loan from Juventus.

Club career

Early career and Genoa 
Rovella started playing football at Accademia Inter (an affiliate of Inter Milan), where he won a Gothia Cup, before moving to Alcione in 2014. Then, in summer 2017, Rovella joined Genoa, where he immediately won the Carlin's Boys youth tournament.

Coming through the youth ranks of the club, Rovella made his professional debut with Genoa on 3 December 2019, replacing Francesco Cassata in the final minutes of a 3–2 Coppa Italia win over Ascoli. He then made his Serie A debut on 21 December 2019, aged 18, as a substitute for Filip Jagiełło in a 4–0 away defeat to Inter Milan. On 25 July 2020, Rovella made his first start for Genoa in a 3–0 home loss against Inter.

Rovella gained more playing time and starts during the 2020–21 season, establishing himself in Genoa's central midfield as he helped the rossoblù stay in the Serie A.

Juventus

Loan to Genoa 
On 29 January 2021, Juventus announced the signing of Rovella on a three-and-a-half-year contract for €18 million, plus a maximum of €20 million in performance-related bonuses. The player remained on loan at Genoa until the end of the 2021–22 season, with Manolo Portanova and Elia Petrelli also being traded to the club in permanent moves. Rovella was part of Genoa's relegation to the Serie B after 15 years in the top-flight.

Return to Juventus 
After returning to Juventus from his loan to Genoa, Rovella made his bianconeri debut on 15 August 2022, replacing Manuel Locatelli in a home win against Sassuolo in the first matchday of the 2022–23 Serie A.

Loan to Monza 
On 31 August 2022, Rovella joined newly-promoted Serie A side Monza on a one-year dry loan. He made his debut on 5 September, as a starter in a 2–0 league defeat to Atalanta.

International career
Rovella has represented Italy at several youth international levels.

He was part of the under-17 national team that finished runners-up at the 2018 European Championship, and then was capped at under-18 and under-19 levels.

On 12 November 2020, Rovella made his debut with the under-21 team, playing as a starter in a European Championship qualifying match against Iceland in Reykjavík, which was won 2–1 by the Azzurrini. He was subsequently included in the squad that took part in the 2021 European Championship in Slovenia and Hungary: However, he got sent off after receiving a double yellow card in the second group stage game against Spain, as Italy was eventually eliminated from the tournament in the quarter finals, after a 5–3 loss to Portugal.

Rovella was confirmed in the following cycle of the under-21 national team, as he scored his first goal for the Azzurrini on 29 March 2022, netting the lone goal of a 1–0 win against Bosnia and Herzegovina in the European Championship qualifiers.

Style of play 
Rovella is a well-rounded, right-footed and versatile midfielder, who can play as a mezzala, playmaker or attacking midfielder. His biggest strengths are his first touch, his vision, his passing range and his tactical intelligence. Rovella is also regarded for his elegant style of play and his charisma.

Career statistics

References

External links
 Profile at Lega Serie A
 Profile at A.C. Monza 
 
 
 
 
 

2001 births
Living people
People from Segrate
Sportspeople from the Metropolitan City of Milan
Footballers from Lombardy
Italian footballers
Association football midfielders
Genoa C.F.C. players
Juventus F.C. players
A.C. Monza players
Serie A players
Italy youth international footballers
Italy under-21 international footballers